Abu Seyleh-ye Sofla (also Romanized as Abū Seyleh-ye Soflá) is a village in Jarahi Rural District, in the Central District of Mahshahr County, Khuzestan Province, Iran. At the 2006 census, its population was 20, in 4 families.

References 

Populated places in Mahshahr County